Sheikh (also known as Shiikh or Upper Sheikh), is a city in central Somaliland (a state in the Horn of Africa that separated from Somalia in 1991 and is not internationally recognized). Sheikh is the capital of the Sheikh district in the region/province Sahil. It lies at an altitude of some 1430 m in the Golis Mountains, roughly halfway between the larger cities of Berbera (on the coast of the Gulf of Aden, at a distance of about 71 km) and Burao (further inland, around 60 km from Sheikh).
The broader Sheikh District has a total population of 133,625 residents.

Description

Sheikh lies on the tarmacked road from Berbera to Burao. This so-called Burao-Berbera Highway is one of the most scenic drives in Somaliland. Coming from hot and arid Berbera the climb into the Golis Mountains starts after some 46 km at the village of Laaleys. The landscape then quickly becomes greener and, via a series of hairpin bends, the Sheikh pass is reached at about 1490 m above sea level. This is followed by a short descent to Sheikh, which lies on a plateau at about 1430 m. Actually, therefore, the Golis Mountains are not a mountain range, but the jagged northern edge of the Somali plateau.
The core of the town has a rectangular street plan. There are four hotels (MashaAllah, Daalo, the Ayaan Muniiro hotel, and the large 5-storey Hashi Baroo hotel). Furthermore, there are at least two pharmacies and several shops and eateries.Sheikh used to have an airstrip; it has now fallen into disuse but is still recognizable in the landscape

Several sources indicate that Sheikh is said to contain old British colonial buildings and temple ruins similar to those on the Deccan Plateau in India. These reports appear to be from an article in a Scottish geographic journal from 1898, among others. In practice and on the internet, there is nothing of historical buildings or ruins to be found, and modern guidebooks describe the city as humdrum: mundane, boring.

Just outside the city is the Pharo Secondary School. It is a large complex founded in 1958 as the "SOS Hermann Gmeiner Sheikh Secondary School" and was run by SOS Children's Villages. In 1989, the school was looted and destroyed by Siad Barre's troops. In 2003, the complex was restored by a British couple and reopened. For this they had to pay with their lives, as a few months after the school's reopening they were murdered by terrorists from Al-Itihaad al-Islamiya because the school alledgedly converted pupils to Christianity. Several senior politicians were educated here, including two former Somaliland presidents, Ahmed Silanyo and Ibrahim Egal. The school has strict entry requirements; only the best students are admitted. In 2019, management of the school was taken over by The Pharo Foundation from SOS Children's Villages and the name changed. There are about 260 students (2022).

Administrative division
Most maps still indicate that the Sheikh District is one of the three districts in the Togdheer region/province, cf. the old 1986 administrative division of Somalia. However, an administrative redivision took place in 2002, transferring Sheikh District to the newly created Saaxil region, which initially became composed of five districts. In 2019, Saaxil's administrative divisions were reorganized and further divided, this time into eight districts. In the process, Sheikh's position as the capital of its own district was confirmed; see Art. 10.1 of the Regions and Districts Self-management Law, No. 23/2019. The boundaries of the 8 districts were not spelled out in the law and so it is unclear which settlements are in Sheikh's district, apart from Sheikh itself.

Climate
Sheikh has a warm semi-arid steppe climate (BSh in the Köppen Climate Classification), tempered by the substantial altitude at which the town is situated, with an average annual temperature of 19.1 °C. Temperature variation is limited; the coldest month is January (average 14.4 °C); the warmest June (22.5 °C). Rainfall amounts to about 466 mm annually. April - May is the first rainy season (the so-called Gu rains) and these are also the two wettest months in which about 70mm falls. From August - October, there is a second rainy season (the so-called Dayr rains). Incidentally, rainfall can vary greatly from year to year. The dry season is from November - March.

See also
 Kal-Sheikh

External links 
 'Zoomable' satellite imagery of Sheikh: Google Maps and Bing Maps.
 Maps of the former Sheikh District (i.e. when it was still part of the Togdheer Region) with the location of Sheikh: here and here. NB: the current Sheikh District (in the Saaxil region) is probably smaller.
 Video: a virtual drive from Sheikh to Laaleys through the Golis mountains (14 min.)

Notes

References
 Sheikh, Somalia
 Regions of Somaliland - page 8.

Populated places in Sahil, Somaliland